This is a list of books published by and about Bob Dylan.

Books by Bob Dylan

 Edited by Christopher Ricks, Lisa Nemrow, Julie Nemrow.

Art books by Bob Dylan

Interviews with Bob Dylan

Biographies of Bob Dylan

Books about Bob Dylan
 

 

 
 
 

 
 

 
 
 
 
 
 
 

 
 
 
 
Kramer, Daniel (1967). Bob Dylan. Citadel Press.
 
 
 
 

 
 
 
 
 
 
 
 
 
 
 

 
 
 

 

Ribakove, Sy & Barbara Ribakove (1966). Folk-Rock: The Bob Dylan Story. Dell.

Scaduto, Anthony (1971). Bob Dylan: An Intimate Biography. Grossert & Dunlap. ISBN 978-0448020341.
 

Thompson, Toby (1971). Positively Main Street: An Unorthodox View of Bob Dylan. Coward-McCann. ISBN 978-0698103054.

Books by Bob Dylan translated into Spanish
Letras completes; Traductores: Miquel Izquierdo, José Moreno,Diego A. Manrique Ed. Malpaso. 2016.
Canciones; selección, traducción y prólogo de Eduardo Chamorro, Visor, 1971. 
George Jackson y otras canciones; (selección y traducción de Antonio Resines), Visor, 1972; reedición, 1996.
Escritos, canciones y dibujos; Editorial R. Aguilera/Ediciones Castilla, 1975 - Versión bilingüe (inglés/castellano) of Writings and Drawings by Bob Dylan, originally published by Alfred A. Knopf (1973).
Canciones 1, Editorial Fundamentos, colección Espiral, Madrid, 1984 - Comprende las canciones de Dylan editadas en sus álbumes oficiales desde 1961 hasta 1965.
Canciones 2, Editorial Fundamentos, colección Espiral, Madrid, 1985 - Comprende las canciones de Dylan editadas en sus álbumes oficiales desde "Blonde On Blonde" hasta "Blood On The Tracks", de 1966 a 1974.
The 30th Anniversary Concert Celebration (traducción de Alberto Manzano). Celeste ediciones, Madrid, 1993.
Greatest Hits/Unplugged; (traducción de Alberto Manzano). Celeste ediciones, Madrid, 1995.
Del huracán a las tierras altas 1975-1997. Escritos y canciones (traducción de Antonio J. Iriarte y Francisco J. García Cubero), Valencia, 1999.
Tarántula (trad. de Gabriel Zadunaisky), Granica Editor, Argentina, 1973.
Tarántula (trad. de Ignacio Renom), Ed. Júcar, Colección Los Juglares, Madrid, 1996.
Tarántula (Trad. de Alberto Manzano). Ed. Global Rhythm Press. Barcelona, 2007.
Tarántula Ed. Malpaso. 2017.
Crónicas, Vol I., Ed. Global Rhythm Press, Barcelona, 2005.
Crónicas, Vol I.,Edición de bolsillo. Ed. RBA, Barcelona, 2007.
Crónicas, Vol I.,Ed. Malpaso, 2017.
Canciones. Ed. Arquitrave. Canciones reúne medio centenar de textos de Bob Dylan traducidos por Gabriel Jiménez Emán.
Letras 1962-2001; Ed. Alfaguara Global Rhythm, 2007.
Fotorretórica de Hollywood. El Manuscrito perdido, Ed. Alfaguara Global Rhythm, 2009. Bob Dylan and Barry Feinstein.

Books about Bob Dylan published in Spanish
Dylan, historias, canciones y poesía Ed. Libros Cúpula, Barcelona, 2009. Dirigido por Mark Blake (Prólogo de Bono).
Bob Dylan. El álbum 1956-1966 Ed. GlobalRhythm, Edición de Adrienne Wiley. Barcelona, 2005.
Araguas, Vicente: El mundo poético de Bob Dylan, Ed. Pigmalión, 2017.
Bauldie, John: Bob Dylan. Se busca, Celeste Ediciones, Madrid, 1994.
Becerril Zúñiga, Pachi: Once upon a time... 365 días en la vida de Bob Dylan. Uno Editorial. 2017.
Cott, Jonathan: Dylan sobre Dylan, Ed. Global Rhythm Press, Barcelona, 2008. Recopilación de entrevistas.
Curado, Antonio: 20/20 Visión: apuntes sobre la obra de Bob Dylan, Ed. Covarrubias, Toledo, 2007.
Escudero, Vicente: Bob Dylan, Editorial Lumen, Barcelona, junio de 1991.
Escudero, Vicente: Bob Dylan 4, Ediciones Júcar, colección "Los juglares", mayo de 1992.
Escudero, Vicente: Bob Dylan. Luces y sombras, Editorial La Máscara, abril de 1993.
Escudero, Vicente: Bob Dylan en la prensa española (1980 - 1993), Ed. Júcar, col. "Los Juglares", diciembre de 1995.
Escudero, Vicente: Bob Dylan. Los discos, Ed. Júcar, col. "Los juglares", abril de 1996.
Escudero, Vicente: Bob Dylan. Las canciones, Ed. Júcar, col. "Los juglares", abril de 1996.
Escudero, Vicente: Bob Dylan. Las palabras, Ed. Júcar, col. "Los juglares", abril de 1996.
Faux, Danny: Bob Dylan 3, Ed. Júcar, col. “Los juglares”, julio de 1982.
García, Francisco: Bob Dylan en España. Mapas de carretera para el alma; Editorial Milenio, diciembre de 2000.
Jové, Josep Ramón: Bob Dylan disco a disco. 1961-1996. Canciones para después del diluvio, Ed. Milenio, Lleida, 1997.
Izquierdo, Eduardo: Bob Dylan. La trilogía del tiempo y el amor. 66rpm Edicions. 2014.
Ledesma Saúco, Javier: Bob Dylan, Dios y Jesucristo. ¿Una provocación?, Ed. C&G, 2014. - Páginas: 192 - Medidas:17x24 cm - Encuadernación: Rústica cosida a hilo.
López Poy, Manuel: Bob Dylan, Ed. Ma Non Troppo, 2016.
Manzano, Alberto: Bob Dylan, Salvat, col. Video Rock; Barcelona, 1991.
Marcus, Greil: Like A Rolling Stone. Bob Dylan en la encrucijada, Ed. Global Rhythm Press. Barcelona, 2010.
Margotin, Philippe y Guesdon, Jean-Michel: Bob Dylan. Todas sus canciones,Ed. Blume.2015.
Martín, Luis: Bob Dylan, Ediciones Cátedra, col. Rock Pop; Madrid, 1991.
Miles, Barry: Bob Dylan visto por sí mismo, Ed. Júcar; Madrid, 1984.
Ordovás, Jesús: Bob Dylan 1, Ed. Júcar, col. “Los juglares”, octubre de 1972.
Polizzotti, Mark: Highway 61 Revisited, Ed. Libros Crudos; Colección 33 1/3, 2010.
Rato, Mariano Antolín: Bob Dylan 2, Ed. Júcar, col. “Los juglares”, septiembre de 1975.
Rémond, Alain: Los caminos de Bob Dylan, Ediciones Sígueme, 1972. Editado inicialmente por Epi sa Editeurs, París, 1971.
Ricks, Christopher: Dylan poeta: visiones del pecado, Editorial: Cuadernos de Langre / San Lorenzo de El Escorial, 2007.
Santelli, Robert (comp.): Bob Dylan: el álbum. 1956-1966. Ed. Global Rhythm Press. 2005.
Scaduto, Anthony: Bob Dylan, Ed. Júcar, col. "Los juglares serie especial”, primera edición, octubre de 1976 (segunda edición, mayo de 1983).
Shepard, Sam: Rolling Thunder: Con Bob Dylan en la carretera. Ed. Anagrama. Barcelona, 2006.
Sierra i Fabra, Jordi: Bob Dylan 1941-1979, Edicomunicación, 1979.
Sierra i Fabra y Jordi Bianciotto: Bob Dylan. Ed. Folio S.A. Biografías ABC, 2005.
Sierra i Fabra, Jordi: Bob Dylan 99 razones para amarlo (o no), Ed. Planeta, 2017.
Sounes, Howard: Bob Dylan. La biografía. Ed. Sudamericana de Bolsillo, 2001.
Sounes, Howard: Bob Dylan. La biografía. Edición ampliada. Ed. Reservoir Books, 2016.
Southall, Brian: Los tesoros de Bob Dylan. Ed. Libros Cúpula, 2013.
Vico Puertas, Darío: Bob Dylan. Ed. La Máscara SL, 2000.
Williams, Paul: Bob Dylan. Años de juventud. Ed. Robinbook (ma non troppo). Barcelona, 2004.
Williams, Paul: Bob Dylan. Años de madurez. Ed. Robinbook (ma non troppo). Barcelona, 2005.
Williams, Paul: Bob Dylan. Años de luces y sombras. Ed. Robinbook (ma non troppo). Barcelona, 2005.

Footnotes

External links
 Come Writers And Critics lists all the books ever published in the world about Bob Dylan, in 31 languages so far.
 The Life & Work of Bob Dylan Collection at La Salle University is the largest academic collection of Bob Dylan works and memorabilia

Books about Bob Dylan
Music bibliographies
Bibliographies by writer
Bibliographies of American writers